Wabasha III (Wapahaśa) (c. 1816–1876) was a prominent Dakota Sioux chief, also known as Joseph Wabasha. He succeeded his father as head chief of the Mdewakanton Dakota in 1836. Following the Dakota War of 1862 and the forced removal of the Dakota to Crow Creek Reservation, Wabasha became known as head chief of the Santee Sioux. In the final years of his life, Chief Wabasha helped his people rebuild their lives at the Santee Reservation in Nebraska.

In 1862, Wabasha had opposed the Dakota uprising from the start but had struggled to gain support. In the final weeks of the war, Wabasha — together with Wakute II and Taopi — sent messages to Colonel Henry Hastings Sibley voicing their opposition to Little Crow and offering their assistance to the U.S. Wabasha's son-in-law, Hdainyanka, was one of the 38 Dakota men executed in Mankato, Minnesota on December 26, 1862.

In 1986, a bust of Chief Wabasha III was installed at the Minnesota State Capitol.

Succession as chief 
Before succeeding his father in 1836, Chief Wabasha III was known as Tatepsin, which is translated as "Upsetting Wind" or "Bounding Wind." 

Chief Wabasha II died during a smallpox epidemic that killed many in his Kiyuksa (Keoxa) band. 

Around the time that Tatepsin became chief, the Kiyuksa band was twice as large as any other Mdewakanton band.The Kiyuksa band migrated periodically between the mouth of the upper Iowa River and Lake Pepin, and hunted on both sides of the upper Mississippi River.

Wabasha had extensive kinship ties to "mixed-blood" traders and settlers in the area. In 1842, Chief Wabasha III presuaded Indian agent Amos Bruce to employ his relative, James Reed.

Treaties 
On September 10, 1836, Tatepsin signed the fifth Treaty of Prairie du Chien with acting Indian agent Colonel Zachary Taylor. The treaty relinquished all Sioux claims to what is now northwest Missouri to the United States. 

Chief Wabasha signed the 1851 and 1858 treaties that ceded the southern half of what is now the state of Minnesota to the United States. These land sales began the removal of his band to the reservation on the Minnesota River.

Opposition to Dakota uprising 
In 1862, Wabasha had opposed the Dakota uprising from the start but had struggled to gain support.

Removal to Crow Creek 
The Dakota were removed from Minnesota to Crow Creek Reservation in Dakota Territory.

Santee Sioux Reservation 
They then moved to the Santee Reservation in Nebraska, where the last chief Wabasha died on April 23, 1876.

References

External links
Dakota-Lakota-Nakota Human Rights Advocacy Coalition: Chiefs: Chief Wapasha III c. 1816 – April 23, 1876, excerpted from: "Explorers found hills, valleys alive with Indians," Steve Kerns, Winona Sunday News, 14 november 1976
grave of Chief Wabasha, III

Native American leaders
Dakota people
1810s births
1876 deaths
Native Americans in Minnesota